Oliver Muirhead (born 29 May 1957) is an English character actor, known for often portraying pompous country gentlemen. In 1986, he also directed the musical pantomime A Christmas Held Captive. In addition to acting, Muirhead has also lent his voice to various animated series such as P.J. Sparkles and Spider-Man: The Animated Series and the video games Zork: Grand Inquisitor, Dead to Rights, The Hobbit and Eragon.

He is known in the United States for his appearances in 1990s commercials for Tombstone Pizza. He also had a memorable cameo as a sarcastic jeweller in the Friends episode "The One with the Ring".

In 1991, he starred in the soap opera Santa Barbara as Mr. Marx: he hired Gina at the Santa Barbara Sperm Bank.

Filmography

External links

References 

1957 births
English expatriates in the United States
English male film actors
English male stage actors
English male television actors
English male voice actors
20th-century English male actors
21st-century English male actors
Living people
Male actors from London
English people of Irish descent